Charles Allee (10 February 1848 – 7 June 1896) was an Australian cricketer. He played six first-class cricket matches for Victoria between 1873 and 1878.

See also
 List of Victoria first-class cricketers

References

External links
 

1848 births
1896 deaths
Australian cricketers
Victoria cricketers
Cricketers from Melbourne